Skiptracers is a 2009 American comedy film directed by Harris Mendheim and starring Daniel Burnley, Michael H. Cole, Cynthia Evans, and Eddie Galey. The film was theatrically released in the US on 11 September 2009.

See also
 Skiptrace
 bounty hunting

External links

2009 films
2009 comedy films
American comedy films
2000s English-language films
2000s American films